The Caribbean Premier League (abbreviated to CPL or CPLT20) is an annual Twenty20 cricket tournament held in the Caribbean. It was founded by Cricket West Indies in 2013 to replace the Caribbean Twenty20 as the premier Twenty20 competition in the Caribbean. It is currently sponsored by Hero MotoCorp and consequently officially named the Hero CPL. The inaugural tournament was won by the Jamaica Tallawahs who defeated the Guyana Amazon Warriors in the final.

History
Twenty20 domestic cricket first appeared in an organised manner in the West Indies in 2006 with the privately organised Stanford 20/20. The second and last edition of the Stanford competition was officially made part of the West Indies Cricket Board (WICB) calendar in 2008, after which the tournament ended when its sponsor Allen Stanford was charged with fraud and arrested in June 2009. The next organised Twenty20 competition came about with the creation of the Caribbean Twenty20 tournament by the WICB. The Caribbean Twenty20 was created to fill the gap left by the end of the Stanford 20/20 and to coincide with the 2010 Champions League Twenty20 tournament, which started less than two months after. The top domestic team from the Caribbean Twenty20 tournament qualified for the Champions League as the sole representative of the West Indies.

The WICB first announced the plans for the Caribbean Premier League in September 2012 when it was revealed that the board was "in the advanced stages of discussions to have a commercial Twenty20 league in the region" with an unnamed investor and hoped to conclude a deal before 30 September. On 14 September, the board met to make decisions on the structure and organisation of the Caribbean Twenty20 CPL Schedule in January; to discuss the governance structure of the board and also discuss the planned commercial Twenty20 league and to finalise its structure. The Federation of International Cricketers' Associations (FICA) and the West Indies Players Association (WIPA) were also to be brought in to discuss issues pertaining to players in relation to the planned T20 league. On 13 December 2012, the WICB announced that they had finalised an agreement with Ajmal Khan founder of Verus International, a Barbados-based merchant bank, for the funding of the new franchise-based Twenty20 league to be launched in 2013. It was then expected that the new Caribbean Premier League was likely to comprise six Caribbean city-based franchises as opposed to the current territorial set-up with the majority of the players are to come from the West Indies. As part of the agreement, the WICB will receive additional funding from Verus International for additional retainer contracts for players in addition to the 20 annual retainer contracts the board currently funds.

Dates for the tournament were confirmed for the 2013 Caribbean Premier League as 29 July to 26 August.  The 2014 and 2015 tournaments took place between 5 July to 10 August and 21 June to 26 July respectively and the 2016 tournament took place between 29 June to 7 August.

Format

CPL
The CPL T20 tournament is played between six teams and is divided into a group stage and a knockout stage. In the group stage, the teams each play ten matches overall, three of which are at home. This unusual format occurs because all six teams are co-located at a single playing site for five sequential matches of the tourney, then the whole tournament moves to a new location for five more games (and so on). Six stadiums are used (see Venues below), each a home field for one of the teams. The playoff stage includes two semi-finals and a final to determine the winner of the tournament. All three of the elimination playoff games will be played at Queen's Park Oval and Brian Lara Stadium .

The 6ixty

The 6ixty is a T10 league organized by Cricket West Indies and the Caribbean Premier League that is scheduled to be played four times a year, starting with a five-day men's and women's tournament in August 2022. A number of significant changes are made to the usual rules of T10 cricket: 

 Teams are all out (i.e. they can't bat anymore) upon losing 6 wickets, rather than 10. 
 The first 5 overs of each innings will all be bowled from one end of the pitch, with the other 5 overs bowled from the other end. 
 Fielding teams must bowl the 10 overs of an innings within 45 minutes, or they lose a fielder during the final over.
 The batting team can 'unlock' a third powerplay over by hitting two sixes in the initial two powerplay overs.

Teams

The tournament includes six franchises with 15 contracted players each, including a maximum of five international players and four players under the age of 23. Each team has one local and one international franchise player.

Tournament season and results
Out of the six teams that have played in the Caribbean Premier League since its inception, one team has won the competition four times, two teams have won the competition twice and one team have won the competition once. Trinbago Knight Riders are the most successful team in the history of Caribbean Premier League. The Barbados Tridents have won two titles, where the Jamaica Tallawahs also have won two titles. Trinbago Knight Riders who defeated St Lucia Zouks in the final of 2020 Season to secure their fourth CPL title and winning back-to-back championships. The current champions are St Kitts & Nevis Patriots who  defeated the Saint Lucia Kings by three wickets to win their first CPL title.

Teams' performances

Sponsorships
Caribbean mobile network Digicel was named as the first global sponsor for the inaugural 2013 tournament and beyond in a multi-year deal. As previous sponsors of the West Indies cricket team and the Digicel Caribbean Cup the brand has considerable experience with sponsoring cricket and other sporting events throughout the Caribbean. "The CPL is a perfect fit for Digicel.  We’re huge fans of West Indies cricket and this is a great opportunity for us to invest not only in what will be an amazing event, but also in the young cricketers who will benefit from around the region," stated Digicel Group Marketing Operations Director Kieran Foley.

Following the acquisition of the Guyana Amazon Warriors franchise owner, Dr. Ranjisingh 'Bobby' Ramroop's New GPC Inc, specifically its Limacol brand, has assumed the title sponsorship of the CPL.

In June 2013 Courts announced their sponsorship of the Caribbean Premier League "CPL's partnership with Courts is a very strategic and beneficial one to both parties, and we are thrilled about the possibilities that exist for us from a marketing perspective," said CPL CEO Damien O' Donohoe. "Combining our advertising and marketing programmes with that of Courts will heighten the awareness of CPL across the region, and increase fan support, which will put people in the stands at matches and customers in the aisles of Courts."

El Dorado Rum has been named as an official partner of the inaugural tournament, and sponsors the tournament's Catch of the Match award, which goes to one player in each game who makes a thrilling catch.

Broadcasters

Salary cap
As of 12 June 2020, the Caribbean Premier League's salary cap is US$545,500 per season. This is after a 30% reduction in Players Salaries due to COVID-19 Pandemic.

See also 

 List of Caribbean Premier League cricket five-wicket hauls

References

External links
 
 Caribbean Premier League at ESPN Cricinfo

 
West Indian cricket in the 20th century
Twenty20 cricket leagues
Recurring sporting events established in 2013
Professional cricket leagues
Multi-national professional sports leagues